Saint Clare's Hospital - Boonton, located at 130 Powervile Road Boonton Township, New Jersey, is a 100-bed psychiatric facility.

Description
The hospital has children crisis intervention services (CCIS), adult crisis intervention services (ACIS), alcohol & chemical dependency unit (ACDU), and psychiatric intensive care unit (PICU). The hospital also several outpatient programs, for adults and children. The hospital was once called Riverside Hospital. About 20 years after the hospital started, Saint Clare's merged with it to create Saint Clare's Riverside Hospital.

St. Clare's Hospital was acquired by Prime Healthcare Services on July 31, 2015. The effective date of the sale was deferred until October 1, 2015.

The hospital also serves as a base for two Saint Clare's EMS ambulances, part of the larger Saint Clare's Health EMS Department.

See also 
 In re Quinlan: court case for a patient

References

External links
 

Companies based in Morris County, New Jersey
Psychiatric hospitals in New Jersey
Hospitals with year of establishment missing
Boonton Township, New Jersey